Tasmanian mammals are divided into three major groups based on reproductive techniques: egg laying mammals (the monotremes), pouched mammals (the marsupials), and placental mammals. This is a list of mammals of Tasmania:

Order: Monotremata (monotremes)

 Family: Ornithorhynchidae
 Genus: Ornithorhynchus
 Platypus, Ornithorhynchus anatinus 
 Family: Tachyglossidae
 Genus: Tachyglossus
 Short-beaked echidna, Tachyglossus aculeatus

Infraclass: Marsupialia (marsupials)

Order: Dasyuromorphia (marsupial carnivores)
 Family: Thylacinidae
 Genus: Thylacinus
 Thylacine, T. cynocephalus  endemic
 Family: Dasyuridae
 Subfamily: Dasyurinae
 Tribe: Dasyurinae
 Genus: Dasyurus
 Tiger quoll, D. maculatus 
 Eastern quoll, D. viverrinus  endemic (introduced to Australian mainland)
 Genus: Sarcophilus
 Tasmanian devil, S. harrisii  endemic
 Tribe: Phascogalini
 Genus: Antechinus
 Swamp antechinus, A. minimus 
 Dusky antechinus, A. swainsonii 
 Subfamily: Sminthopsinae
 Tribe: Sminthopsini
 Genus: Sminthopsis
 White-footed dunnart, S. leucopus

Order: Peramelemorphia (bandicoots and bilbies)

 Family: Peramelidae
 Subfamily: Peramelinae
 Genus: Isoodon
 Southern brown bandicoot, Isoodon obesulus 
 Genus: Perameles
 Eastern barred bandicoot, Perameles gunnii

Order: Diprotodontia

Suborder: Vombatiformes (wombats and koalas)
 Family: Vombatidae
 Genus: Vombatus
 Common wombat, Vombatus ursinus

Suborder: Phalangeriformes (possums and gliders)
 Family: Phalangeridae
 Genus: Trichosurus
 Common brushtail possum, Trichosurus vulpecula 
 Family: Burramyidae
 Genus: Cercartetus
 Tasmanian pygmy possum, Cercartetus lepidus 
 Eastern pygmy possum, Cercartetus nanus 
 Family: Petauridae
 Genus: Petaurus
 Krefft's glider, Petaurus notatus introduced (Australian mainland native)
 Family: Pseudocheiridae
 Genus: Pseudocheirus
 Common ringtail possum, Pseudocheirus peregrinus

Suborder: Macropodiformes (kangaroos and wallabies)

 Family: Potoroidae
 Genus: Bettongia
 Southern bettong, Bettongia gaimardi endemic 
 Genus: Potorous
 Long-nosed potoroo, Potorous tridactylus 
 Family: Macropodidae
 Genus: Macropus
 Eastern grey kangaroo, Macropus giganteus 
 Genus: Notamacropus
 Red-necked wallaby, N. rufogriseus 
 Genus: Thylogale
 Tasmanian pademelon, Thylogale billardierii endemic

Infraclass: Eutheria (placentals)

Order: Artiodactyla (even-toed ungulates)
 Family: Cervidae
 Subfamily: Cervinae
 Genus: Dama
 Common fallow deer, Dama dama introduced

Order: Carnivora
 Family: Otariidae (eared seals)
 Genus: Arctocephalus
 Cape fur seal, Arctocephalus pusillus 
 New Zealand fur seal, Arctocephalus fosteri 
 Family: Phocidae (true seals)
 Genus: Mirounga
 Southern elephant seal, Mirounga leonina 
 Genus: Hydrurga
 Leopard seal, Hydrurga leptonyx

Order: Chiroptera (bats)
 Family: Vespertilionidae
 Genus: Vespadelus
 Little forest bat, Vespadelus vulturnus LR/lc
 Southern forest bat, Vespadelus regulus LR/lc
 Large forest bat, Vespadelus darlingtoni LR/lc
 Genus: Chalinolobus
 Chocolate wattled bat, Chalinolobus morio 
 Gould's wattled bat, Chalinolobus gouldii LR/lc
 Genus: Nyctophilus
 Lesser long-eared bat, Nyctophilus geoffroyi 
 Greater long-eared bat, Nyctophilus timoriensis 
 Genus: Falsistrellus
 Eastern false pipistrelle, Falsistrellus tasmaniensis

Lagomorpha
 Family: Leporidae (rabbits and hares)
 Genus: Oryctolagus
 European rabbit, Oryctolagus cuniculus introduced
 Genus: Lepus
 European hare, Lepus europaeus introduced

Rodentia (rats and mice)
 Family: Muridae
 Genus: Hydromys
 Rakali, Hydromys chrysogaster 
 Genus: Mus
 House mouse, Mus musculus LC introduced
 Genus: Pseudomys
 Long-tailed mouse, Pseudomys higginsi LR/lc endemic
 New Holland mouse, Pseudomys novaehollandiae 
 Genus: Mastacomys
 Broad-toothed mouse, Mastacomys fuscus 
 Genus: Rattus
 Swamp rat, Rattus lutreolus LR/lc
 Black rat, Rattus rattus LC introduced
 Brown rat, Rattus norvegicus LC introduced

Order: Cetacea (whales and dolphins)

Suborder: Odontoceti (toothed whales)
 Family: Delphinidae (dolphins)
 Genus: Globicephala
 Long-finned pilot whale, Globicephala melaena 
 Genus: Orcinus
 Killer whale, Orcinus orca 
 Genus: Pseudorca
 False killer whale, Pseudorca crassidens 
 Genus: Delphinus
 Short-beaked common dolphin, Delphinus delphis 
 Genus: Tursiops
 Common bottlenose dolphin, Tursiops truncatus 
 Family: Physeteridae (sperm whales)
 Genus: Physeter
 Sperm whale, Physeter catodon

Parvorder: Mysticeti (baleen whales)
 Family: Balaenidae (right whales)
 Genus: Eubalaena
 Southern right whale, Eubalaena australis 
 Genus: Caperea
 Pygmy right whale, Caperea marginata 
 Genus: Megaptera
 Humpback whale, Megaptera novaeangliae

See also
 List of mammals of Australia
 List of bats of Australia
 List of rodents of Australia
 List of marine mammals of Australia
List of monotremes and marsupials

References 
 Tasmanian Parks and Wildlife list of Mammals
 DPIW - Complete list of Tasmania's mammals
 List of introduced vertebrates of Tasmania

 
Mammals
Tasmania, Mammals